An incomplete list of schools in Colombia:

High schools

Leticia
Colegio Indígena Casa del Conocimiento
Colegio nocturno Alvernia
Colegio Villa Carmen

Antioquia

Medellín
Colegio Salesiano El Sufragio
Colegio Bethlemitas
Colegio Gimnasio Internacional de Medellín
Colegio De La Salle
Colegio Alemán (German School)
Colegio Aspen Gimnasio Los Alcazares
The Columbus School (Member of SACS)
Colegio Marymounth
Colegio Theodoro Hertzl
Colegio Calasanz
Colegio Calazans Femenino
Colegio Colombo Britanico
Colegio Panamericano Colombo Sueco
Colegio Jesus Maria
Colegio Maria Auxiliadora
Colegio Maria Mazzarello
Colegio Colombo Frances
Colegio Corazonista
Colegio de La Compañía de María
Colegio de la Presentación
Colegio del Sagrado Corazón de Jesús
Colegio Fontan
Colegio Gimnasio Los Pinares
Colegio La Inmaculada Medelíin
Colegio Liceo Cristo Rey
Colegio Lonardo Da Vinci
Colegio Lord College
Colegio Montessori
Colegio San Ignacio de Loyola
Colegio San José de Las Vegas
Colegio San Jose de La Salle
Colegio Gimnasio Los Cedros
Colegio Padre Manyanet 
Colegio Nuestra Señora del Rosario de Chinquinquira +
Colegio San Juan Bosco
Colegio UPB
Centro Educacional Don Bosco (CEDBOS)
Instituto San Carlos
Instituto Musical Diego Echavarria Misas
Instituto Salesiano Pedro Justo Berrio
Escuela Normal Superior Antioqueña
Escuela Normal Superior de Medellin
Liceo simon bolivar
Liceo Salazar y Herrera
Liceo Consejo de Medellin
INEM José Félix de Restrepo

Atlántico

Barranquilla
Nuevo Colegio del Prado
Colegio Alemán 
Colegio Real (Royal School)
Colegio Biffi-La Salle
Colegio Britanico Internacional (British International College)
Colegio de Barranquilla (CODEBA).
Lyndon B Johnson (Lyndon B.Johnson School)
Colegio San José (CSJB)
Colegio Marymount (Marymount School) 
Colegio del Sagrado Corazon (Puerto Colombia) 
Colegio San Miguel del Rosario 
Colegio Nuestra Señora de Lourdes 
Colegio Altamira International School (Altamira International School)
Colegio Parrish (Karl C. Parrish School)
Corporación Educativa American School 
Colegio Cristiano El-Shaddai 
Colegio Americano de Barranquilla
Institución Educativa Distrital Pestalozzi
Instituto San jose
Colegio J. Vender Murphy
St. Francis International College
Colegio Colón
Colegio de María Auxiliadora
International Berckley School

Bogotá

Bolivar

Cartagena
Colegio Jorge Washington (Miembro de la SACS)
Colegio Británico de Cartagena (Miembro IB)
Gimnasio Cartagena de Indias (Miembro ASPAEN)
Gimnasio Cartagena (Miembro ASPAEN)
Colegio Montessori
Gimnasio Altair de Cartagena
 Cartagena International School
 Colegio La Nueva Esperanza 
 Colegio de La Esperanza
 Colegio Salesiano San Pedro Claver
 Colegio de la Salle Cartagena 
 Colegio Biffi ( Congregación De Hermanas Franciscanas Misioneras De Marìa Auxiliadora)
 Colegio Eucarístico de Santa Teresa [Hermanas Mercedarias del Sanrisimo Sacramento del Altar]
 Corporación Colegio Latinoamericano
 Centro de Enseñanza Precoz Nuevo Mundo
 Ciudad Escolar Comfenalco (Caja de Compensación Familiar de Fenalco)
 Colegio Seminario de Cartagena Eudistas
 INEM José Manuel Rodríguez Torices
 Colegio El Carmelo de Cartagena
 Colegio La Presentación (Hermanas dominicas de la presentación)
 Colegio Nuestra Señora de la Candelaria (Hermanas Franciscanas)
 Institución educativa Nuestra Señora del Carmen (Inenscar)
 Colegio La Anunciación                
 Institución Educativa Juan José Nieto
 Institución Educativa Soledad Acosta de Samper (IESAS)
 Institución Educativa San Francisco de Asis (IESFA)
 Colegio Militar El Pinar de Canadá
 Colegio Militar Fernández Bustamantes (COLMIFEBU)
 Colegio Militar Almirante Colón (COMIALCO)
 Colegio Mixto La Popa
 Colegio Naval Militar Abolsure (Cooabolsure
 Institución Educativa de Promoción Social de Cartagena

Boyacá

Tunja
Colegio de Boyacá
American School
Colegio Los Ángeles
Gimnasio Villa Fontana
Gimnasio Campestre del Norte

Puerto Boyacá
Colegio Departamental San Pedro Claver 
Colegio Santa Teresita

Duitama
Colegio Seminario Diocesano
 Colegio Maria Auxiliadora

Saboyá 

 Colegio Nueva Inglaterra

Caldas

Manizales
Colegio Franciscano Agustín Gemelli
Colegio Granadino (Member of SACS)
colegio mayor de nuestra señora
Colegio de Nuestra Señora del Rosario
Colegio San Luis Gonzaga
Colegio Santa Inés
Gimnasio Campestre La Consolata

Caquetá

Florencia
Colegio Juan Bautista Migani

Casanare

Yopal
Colegio Gimnasio de los Llanos
Institución Educativa Centro Social La Presentación
Instituto Técnico Empresarial de Yopal (ITEY)
Braulio Gonzalez
Institución Educativa Carlos Lléras Restrepo

Cauca

Popayán
Colegio Gimnasio Calibio
Colegio San José de Tarbes
INEM Francisco José de Caldas

Cesar

Valledupar
Colegio San Fernando
Colegio Colombo ingles
Colegio G im ai del Norte
Colegio Hispanoamericano
Colegio Fundacion Manuela Beltran
Colegio María Montessori
Colegio Nacional Loperena
Colegio Parroquial El Carmelo
Colegio Sagrada Familia
Colegio Santafé
Fundación Colegio Bilingüe de Valledupar

Chocó

Quibdó
Instituto Femenino de Enseñanza Media y Profesional

Córdoba

Montería
Colegio Británico de Montería
Colegio La Salle
Gimnasio Campestre
Gimnasio El Recreo
Gimnasio Vallegrande
Windsor Royal School

Cundinamarca
Normal Departamental Mixta de Pasca

Guainía

Inírida
Colegio Luis Carlos Galán Sarmiento
Instituto de Bachillerato Agropecuario Custodio García Rovira

Guaviare

San José del Guaviare
Colegio Departamental de Bachillerato Santander

Huila

Neiva
Colegio Comfamiliar Los Lagos (Ciudadela Educativa Comfamiliar Los Lagos)
Colegio ASPAEN Gimnasio La Fragua
Colegio ASPAEN Gimnasio Yúmana
Colegio Cooperativo Campestre
Colegio Colombus American School
Colegio Colombo Sueco 
Colegio Colombo Ingles Del Huila
Colegio Cooperativo Salesiano San Medardo
Colegio Claretiano
Colegio Humanistico 
Liceo Femenino Santa Librada
Colegio La Presntacion
Colegio Maria Auxiliadora
Colegio Oliverio Lara Bonilla
INEM Julian Motta Salas
Colegio Promocion Social
Colegio Rafael Pombo
Instituto Tecnico Superior
Colegio Mis Monachos

La Guajira
Colegio Albania (Miembro de SACS e IBO)

Magdalena

Santa Marta
 Bureche School
Colegio Bilingue de Santa Marta
Instituto La Milagrosa
Colegio Franciscano de San Luis Beltrán
Colegio Liceo Versalles
Colegio Adventista Marco Fidel Suarez

Meta

Villavicencio
Colegio Espíritu Santo
Nuevo Gimnasio School
Neil Armstrong School

Nariño

Pasto
Colegio Comfamiliar De Nariño

Norte de Santander

Cúcuta
Colegio Calasanz
Colegio Gimnasio Los Almendros
Colegio El Carmen Teresiano
Colegio Santa Teresa La Presentación
Colegio Santo Angel de la Guarda
Colegio Salesiano Clasico
Colegio Sagrado Corazon de Jesus (de la salle)

Chinácota
I.E. Técnica Nuestra Señora de La Presentación
Colegio San Luis Gonzaga
Instituto Técnico  Agropecuario

Putumayo

Mocoa
Institución Educativa Santa María

Quindío

Armenia
Colegio GI School (Gimnasio Inglès)
Colegio Americano De Armenia
Colegio Franciscano San Luis Rey
Colegio Inem Jose Celestino Mutis
Colegio Instituto Tecnico Industrial
Colegio San Francisco Solano
Colegio Carlomagno
Colegio del Sagrado Corazón de Jesús Hermanas Bethlemitas
Colegio de la Sagrada Familia Hermanas Capuchinas
Colegio María Inmaculada
Liceo Anglo-Colombiano Bilingue
Colegio Jorge Isaacs
Institución Educativa CASD

Risaralda

Pereira

list of the best schools in Pereira
Liceo Campestre de Pereira
Liceo Pino Verde
Colegio Diocesano
Colegio Americano
Colegio Calasanz
Colegio Gimnasio Pereira
Colegio De la Salle Pereira
Colegio del Sagrado Corazón de Jesus: Bethlemitas
Colegio Salesiano San Juan Bosco
Fundación Liceo Inglés
Liceo Francés de Pereira
Liceo Pa-panamericano Pereira
Colegio Monseñor Baltazar Álvarez Restrepo
Colegio Franciscanas
Colegio Nuestra Señora de Fátima de la Policía Nacional de Colombia

San Andrés, Providencia y Santa Catalina

San Andrés
Colegio Fray Luis Amigo

Providencia
Institución Educativa Colegio Nacionalizado Mixto de Providencia
Institución Educativa Junín

Santander

Barrancabermeja
Colegio el Rosario 
Colegio Luis Lopez de Meza

Bucaramanga
Colegio Adventista Libertad
Colegio Agustiniano 
Colegio Alfred Nobel
Colegio Bilingüe Divino Niño
Colegio Caldas
Colegio Campestre Goyavier
Colegio Colombianitos Del Mañana
Colegio Comfenalco
Colegio El Inem
Colegio El Pilar
Colegio El Saleciano
Colegio Glenn Domann
Colegio Harvard
Colegio La Merced
Colegio La Nacional De Comercio
Colegio La Normal
Colegio La Presentación
Colegio La Quinta Del Puente
Colegio La Salle
Colegio Lisceo Patria
Colegio Maria Goretiu
Colegio Nuestra Señora de Fatima (de la policia)
Colegio Nuevo Cambridge
Colegio Panamericano
Colegio Principe De Asturias
Colegio Principe San Carlos
Colegio San Luis Beltran Del Lago
Colegio San Patricio
Colegio San Pedro Claver
Colegio San Sebastian
Colegio Santa Ana
Colegio Santa Teresita
Colegio Santander
Fundación Colegio UIS
Gimnasio Aspaen Cantillana
Gimnasio Aspaen Saucara
Gimnasio Jaibaná
Gimnasio Piedemonte
Gimnsaio San Diego

Piedecuesta
Colegio de la Presentación de Piedecuesta

Sucre

Sincelejo
Liceo Panamericano Campestre

Tolima

Ibagué
Colegio Champagnat
Colegio Tolimense
Corporación Colegio San Bonifacio de las Lanzas
Colegio Franciscano Jimenez De Cisneros
Colegio Maria Montessori

Valle del Cauca

Cali 

Colegio Luis Horacio Gómez WALDORF SCHOOL
Colegio Instituto Nuestra Señora de la Asunción (Insa)
Colegio trilingüe Montessori
Centro Educativo Etievan Colegio Encuentros
Colegio Alemán 
Colegio Bennet
Colegio Berchmans
Colegio Bilingue Diana Oese
Colegio Bilingue Lauretta Bender
Colegio Bolivar
Colegio Colombo Britanico
Colegio del Sagrado Corazón de Jesus: Bethlemitas
Colegio Freinet
Colegio Lacordaire
Colegio León de Greiff
Colegio Manchester st Michalec
Colegio San José (Champagnat)
Colegio San Luis Gonzaga de Cali
Colegio Santa Maria Stella Maris
Liceo Benalcazar
Liceo de Los Andes
Liceo Departamental
Liceo Frances Paul Valéry
Liceo Montessori
La Arboleda
Aspaen Liceo Tacuri
Aspaen Colegio Juanambu

Yumbo 
Liceo Comercial de Yumbo or also known as Institucion Educativa Alberto Mendoza Mayor
Colegio Jefferson

Vaupés

Mitú 
Colegio Departamental Inaya
Escuela Normal Superior Indígena María Reina (exclusivo para indigenas)

Vichada

Puerto Carreño 
Colelegio Antonia Santos de Cazuarito
Colegio Comercial José Eustasio Rivera
Escuela Normal Federico Lleras Acosta

See also
 List of Normal Schools by Country

References

External links

Colegio de la Presentación de Piedecuesta
 Colegio de la Presentación de Bucaramanga

Colombia
Colombia
Schools
Schools
Schools